Alicia Barnett (born 18 October 1993) is a British professional tennis player who specialises in doubles. On 24 October 2022, she reached her career-high doubles ranking of world of No. 59.

Biography
Born in the United Kingdom, Barnett began playing tennis at the age of seven. She joined the ITF Women's Circuit at the age of 16/17.

She joined Team Bath Tennis High-International Performance Academy as a 16-year-old, through the Advanced Apprenticeship in Sport and Exercise (AASE) programme and has since returned postgraduate. It is believed that Alicia took her studies abroad and graduated at Northwestern University in Illinois, in 2017.

Barnett is considered a doubles specialist and made her WTA Tour debut at the 2022 Lyon Open, partnering with Olivia Nicholls. The duo reached the final; their subsequent performance throughout 2022 led to both being selected for the British team ties vs. Kazakhstan and Spain at the 2022 Billie Jean King Cup Finals.

Endorsements
Barnett works alongside Italian sports brand, Ellesse and American sports equipment manufacturer, Wilson.

Personal life
Barnett's home is in Painswick, Gloucestershire.

Performance timeline

Doubles
Current through the 2023 Merida Open.

Mixed doubles

WTA career finals

Doubles: 2 (1 title, 1 runner-up)

WTA Challenger finals

Doubles: 1 (runner-up)

ITF Circuit finals

Singles: 1 (runner–up)

Doubles: 29 (15 titles, 14 runner–ups)

References

External links
 
 
 

Living people
1993 births
British female tennis players